Günter Tilch (also Günther Tilch, born 4 May 1937) is a retired German speed skater. He competed at the 1960 and 1964 Winter Olympics in the 500 m and 1500 m events. His best achievement was 20th place in 500 m in 1960. 

He was on the podium of national championships in 1964–1967, but never won them.

Personal bests:
500 m – 41.8 (1963)
 1500 m – 2:15.6 (1963)
 5000 m – 8:35.0 (1965)
 10000 m – 17:42.3 (1965)

References

1937 births
Living people
German male speed skaters
Olympic speed skaters of the United Team of Germany
Speed skaters at the 1960 Winter Olympics
Speed skaters at the 1964 Winter Olympics
Speed skaters from Berlin